KC Eusebio is an IPSC/ USPSA and Steel Challenge action shooting competitor from the US featured on the Hot Shots TV-series.

Merits 
 Youngest USPSA Master at the Age of 10
 Youngest USPSA Grandmaster at the Age of 12
 4 time Open World Steel Challenge Speed Shooting Champion
 4 time Open U.S. National Steel Challenge Speed Shooting Champion
 Owns 5 Steel Challenge World Speed Shooting Records
 2008 IPSC Handgun World Shoot Open division Junior category winner 
 2010 USPSA Handgun Nationals Open Champion
 2013 IPSC Australasia Handgun Championship winner
 2013 European Steel Challenge Speed Shooting Champion

References

External links 
 KC Eusebio Official Facebook Fan Page

IPSC shooters
IPSC World Shoot Champions